A WetBike is a planing motorised personal water craft that is often described as cross between a motorcycle and a jet ski. The original Wetbike was introduced in 1978 by Spirit Marine, a subsidiary of Arctic Enterprises (now known as Arctic Cat). The Wetbike is challenging to ride, because it does require a good deal of balance.

Evolution

The original Wetbike was designed by Nelson Tyler, who became well known for his film industry camera mounts known as the "Tyler Mount". It was based on a motocycle, replacing the wheels by skis and using a pump-jet for propulsion. It debuted in 1978, a few years after the Kawasaki Jet Ski  by Spirit Marine, a subsidiary of what is now Arctic Cat.

At rest, it resembles a sit-down jet ski with handlebars. Gaining speed, it would eventually lift up on the skis, and plane. The directional control was by turning the handlebars, not rotating the hydrojet like for the jet ski. Originally, the Wetbike was powered by a Suzuki two-stroke engine. During the latter years of Wetbikes (late 1980s) there were considerable advances such as 60 hp Suzuki 800 cc engines, and the Metton hulls, which were much lighter than previous models.

Eventually the Wetbike gave way to the new personal water craft (PWC) such as the Yamaha WaveRunner, mainly because they are much easier to ride. They were last produced in 1992. The design was later sold to Kawasaki.

Appearances in media
The first appearance of the Wetbike was in the 1977 James Bond film The Spy Who Loved Me. In one scene, right before the film's end, Bond is seen riding on a Wetbike (the actual Spirit Marine prototype) to villain Karl Stromberg's lair, the submergible fortress Atlantis. Bond refers to the Wetbike as a Q gadget.

The Wetbike appeared in 1982 in CHiPs episode "Overload".  After a short recreational excursion on the Wetbikes, Ponch and Jon use the Wetbikes to chase down microchip thieves trying to escape in a speedboat.  In the background, a sign can be seen that shows the Wetbikes could be rented for $10 per hour, or $75 for a full day.

The Wetbike also appeared in the 1986 comedy Police Academy 3: Back in Training, in which a group of Wetbikes and Kawasaki JS550 stand up jet skis were used by the police to chase down thieves in speedboats during the movie's ending water chase scene.  It also appeared in the 1983 Terence Hill & Bud Spencer spy comedy Go For It!, when Hill was pursuing and picking up Susan Teesdale's character, the lethal barmaid who tried to escape with a parasail, and the 1990 George Clooney film Red Surf, in which it was used by a gang of surfers to transport cocaine.

References

See also
 List of James Bond vehicles

Personal water craft brands